William H. Jones may refer to:
 William H. Jones (Medal of Honor), U.S. Army soldier and Medal of Honor recipient
 William H. Jones (South Carolina politician), state legislator in South Carolina
 William Highfield Jones, English industrialist and mayor of Wolverhampton
 William Hemphill Jones, mayor of Wilmington, Delaware
 William Henry Jones, English Anglican priest, antiquarian and author
 William H. Jones (Mississippi politician), state legislator
 Bert Jones (rugby) (William Herbert Jones), Welsh rugby union and rugby league player

See also
 William Jones (disambiguation)